"I Cry" is a song written by Tia Sillers and Mark Selby, and recorded by American country music artist Tammy Cochran.  It was released in November 2001 as the fourth single from the album Tammy Cochran.  The song reached number 18 on the Billboard Hot Country Singles & Tracks chart.

Charts

Weekly charts

Year-end charts

References

2002 singles
2001 songs
Tammy Cochran songs
Song recordings produced by Blake Chancey
Epic Records singles
Songs written by Tia Sillers
Songs written by Mark Selby (musician)